Amr El Halwani (born 15 March 1985 in Monufia) is an Egyptian footballer. He currently plays for Haras El Hodoud in the Egyptian Premier League, as a left midfielder.

References

External links
 

1985 births
Living people
Egyptian footballers
Egyptian expatriate footballers
Al Ahly SC players
Apollon Pontou FC players
Veria F.C. players
Ethnikos Piraeus F.C. players
Ionikos F.C. players
ENPPI SC players
Egyptian Premier League players
Association football midfielders